Eyesat-1 is an American experimental communications microsatellite with an store-dump payload. The mission of Eyesat-1 was experimental monitoring of mobile industrial equipment. Eyesat-1 has provided the National Oceanic and Atmospheric Administration in Silver Spring, Maryland, with communication services to the South Pole. Eyesat-1 carries an FM repeater for Amateur Radio Research and Development Corporation (AMRAD) called AMRAD OSCAR 27 or OSCAR 27.

Eyesat-1 was launched on September 26, 1993 with an Ariane 4 rocket at Guiana Space Centre, Kourou, French Guiana, along with SPOT-3, Stella, Healthsat-2, KITSAT-2, Itamsat and PoSAT-1.

After 19 years of operation, the satellite failed on December 5, 2012.

In 2020, the satellite was recovered, and its FM repeater became intermittently operational.

Frequencies
 Uplink: 145.850 MHz
 Downlink: 436.795 MHz

External links

References

Satellites orbiting Earth
Amateur radio satellites
Spacecraft launched in 1993